The discography of Neal McCoy, an American country music singer, consists of ten studio albums, two compilation albums and 39 singles.  Two of his singles, "No Doubt About It" and "Wink" both reached number one on the Billboard country charts, and seven more reached top ten. His albums No Doubt About It and You Gotta Love That are both certified platinum by the Recording Industry Association of America (RIAA), and his 1996 self-titled album is certified gold.

Studio albums

1990s

2000s

2010s

Compilation albums

Singles

1980s and 1990s

2000s and 2010s

Other singles

Guest singles

Other charted songs

Music videos

Guest appearances

Notes

References

Country music discographies
Discographies of American artists